Mokofi is a sub-prefecture of Guéra Region in Chad.

Demographics 
Ethnic composition by canton in 2016:

Dayakhiré Canton (population: 23,700; villages: 103):

Mokofi Canton (population: 16,930; villages: 71):

Mousmaré Canton (population: 10,373; villages: 51):

References 

Populated places in Chad